Dashtuiyeh or Dashtooeyeh or Dashtueeyeh, sometimes shortened to Dashtu, may refer to:
 Dashtuiyeh, Hormozgan
 Dashtuiyeh, Fahraj, Kerman Province
 Dashtuiyeh, Ravar, Kerman Province